Leptocereus quadricostatus (also called sebucan) is a species of plant in the family Cactaceae. It is found in Puerto Rico and the British Virgin Islands. Its natural habitats are subtropical or tropical dry forests and subtropical or tropical dry shrubland. It is threatened by habitat loss.

References

Sources

Cactoideae
Cacti of North America
Flora of Puerto Rico
Flora of the British Virgin Islands
Critically endangered flora of North America
Critically endangered flora of the United States
Taxonomy articles created by Polbot